is a Japanese competitive figure skater. She is the 2022 Grand Prix Final champion, a two-time Four Continents champion (2017, 2022), the 2018 Four Continents silver medalist, the 2019 Four Continents bronze medalist, the 2022 MK John Wilson Trophy champion, the 2022 Grand Prix of Espoo champion, and a two-time Japanese national medalist (silver in 2022 and bronze in 2016).

Personal life 
Mihara was born on 22 August 1999 in Kobe, Hyōgo Prefecture, Japan. She began skating during her second year of elementary school, after watching Mao Asada's figure skating performances on TV. Mihara graduated from Ashiya High School in 2018, then obtained an undergraduate degree at Konan University in 2022.

Mihara suffers from juvenile idiopathic arthritis, skating despite the disease. In 2017, she signed an affiliation agreement with Sysmex, a Japanese company involved with healthcare and the promotion of healthy lifestyles. She has donated her hair three times as of 2022 towards the creation of wigs for individuals who have lost hair due to accidents or medical conditions such as alopecia. 

After becoming the Four Continents champion in 2017 while skating to Cinderella, she earned the nickname "Cinderella on Ice".

Career

Early years 
Mihara began skating in 2007. In the 2012–13 season, she won the bronze medal in the Novice A category at the Japanese Novice Championships and placed 8th at the Japan Junior Championships.

2013–2014 season 
During the 2013–14 season, Mihara debuted on the ISU Junior Grand Prix (JGP) circuit, placing fifth in Minsk, Belarus. After winning the Japanese national silver medal on the junior level, she finished her season by placing twelfth on the senior level at the Japan Championships.

2014–2015 season 
Mihara started her season by placing sixth at her JGP event in Ljubljana, Slovenia. She then placed seventh at the Japan Junior Championships and ninth at the Japan Championships.

2015–2016 season 
Mihara made her senior international debut in early August 2015, winning the Asian Open ahead of Riona Kato. She was awarded silver medals at her JGP events in Bratislava, Slovakia and Linz, Austria, and qualified for the 2015–16 JGP Final in Barcelona.

Mihara placed eighth at the 2015–16 Japanese Junior Championships and sixth at the JGP Final. She was diagnosed with arthritis in December, following the JGP Final.

2016–2017 season: Four Continents champion 
In September, Mihara competed at her first Challenger Series competition, the 2016 CS Nebelhorn Trophy. Ranked second in the short program and first in the free skate, she won the gold medal ahead of Russia's Elizaveta Tuktamysheva. Her Grand Prix debut came the following month at the 2016 Skate America. She was awarded the bronze medal, behind American skaters Ashley Wagner and Mariah Bell, after placing second in the short and third in the free. She finished fourth at her next Grand Prix assignment, the 2016 Cup of China.

In December 2016, Mihara took bronze at the Japan Championships, ranking fifth in the short and second in the free.<ref name= In February 2017, she placed fourth in the short and first in the free at the Four Continents Championships in Gangneung, South Korea, outscoring Canada's Gabrielle Daleman by 3.94 points for the gold medal.

In March 2017, Mihara competed at the 2017 World Championships in Helsinki, Finland. Ranked fifteenth in the short program after doubling and falling on a planned triple flip, Mihara ranked fourth in the free skate and climbed to fifth overall. In April, she competed as part of Team Japan at the 2017 World Team Trophy. She achieved a personal best of 72.10 points in the short program and scored a Japanese national record of 146.17 points in the free skate. She finished second behind Medvedeva and 0.83 ahead of compatriot Wakaba Higuchi while Team Japan won the gold medal.

2017–2018 season: Four Continents silver 

Mihara won silver at the 2017 CS Autumn Classic International. She placed fourth at both of her Grand Prix assignments, 2017 Cup of China and 2017 Internationaux de France. 

After a fifth-place finish at the 2017-18 Japan Figure Skating Championships she was assigned to the 2018 Four Continents Championships. At the championships, she was third in the short program behind countrywomen Satoko Miyahara and Kaori Sakamoto. After a second-place finish in the free skate and mistakes from Miyahara, Mihara rose to second place overall.

2018–2019 season: Winter Universiade champion
Mihara won silver at the 2018 CS Nebelhorn Trophy.  In the Grand Prix, she first competed at the 2018 NHK Trophy, the most hotly-contested ladies' event on the Grand Prix that year. She was third in the short program but dropped to fourth in the free skate and overall despite making only one error, a jump under rotation.  She then narrowly placed second at the 2018 Internationaux de France, slightly behind compatriot Rika Kihira.  Mihara said she was unsatisfied with her free skate in France but that "overall, it was a good experience for me, and I will continue to practice to gain more confidence."

At the 2018 Japan Championships, Mihara placed third in both programs, finishing fourth overall. She was again assigned to the Japanese team for the Four Continents Championships. 
Competing at Four Continents, she underrotated her opening combination jump to place eighth in the short program. She described this as an error she would not normally make, even in practice.  Mihara then placed second in the free skate, winning the bronze medal overall, her third consecutive Four Continents podium finish.  Mihara concluded her season at the 2019 Winter Universiade, where she won the ladies singles' title.

2019–2020 season: Hiatus
Poor health forced Mihara to withdraw from both of her Grand Prix assignments, the 2019 Skate Canada International and 2019 Cup of China.  She would not compete for the remainder of the season. Her longtime training mate and friend Kaori Sakamoto would subsequently feel that Mihara's absence from the rink contributed to Sakamoto's lackluster results.

2020–2021 season: Return to competition
Mihara returned to competition domestically, winning the bronze medal at the Kinki Regional Championships and then silver at the Western Sectionals.  With the COVID-19 pandemic affecting international travel, the ISU designed the Grand Prix primarily based on geographic location, and Mihara was one of eleven Japanese skaters assigned to the 2020 NHK Trophy alongside South Korean You Young. She placed seventh in the short program.  Mihara was third in the free skate, rising to fourth place overall, slightly more than four points behind bronze medalist Rino Matsuike. Addressing her return to competition post-illness, she said, "the crowd welcomed me back, and I can't thank them enough."

Competing at the 2020–21 Japan Championships, Mihara was third in the short program with a clean skate. In the free skate, she doubled a planned triple Lutz and ranked seventh in that segment, dropping to fifth place overall.

2021–2022 season: Four Continents champion
Beginning the season at the Olympic test event, the 2021 CS Asian Open Trophy, Mihara won the gold medal. She was initially assigned to only one Grand Prix event, the 2021 Cup of China, which was subsequently replaced by the 2021 Gran Premio d'Italia. Upon Rika Kihira's withdrawal from the 2021 Skate Canada International due to ankle injury, Mihara was named to replace her. Mihara was seventh in the short program at Skate Canada International despite a clean skate but rose to fourth overall with a third-place free skate. She finished 4.53 points behind bronze medalist Alena Kostornaia, with new personal bests in the free skate and total score. Competing in Italy the following week, she again placed fourth, setting new personal bests in the free skate and total score. Speaking afterward, Mihara said she hoped to regain more power and speed.

At the 2021–22 Japan Championships, the final national qualification event for the 2022 Winter Olympics, Mihara placed fifth in the short program. She was fifth as well in the free skate segment, making a notable error by performing only a single Axel instead of a planned double in combination with a triple toe loop. She finished fourth overall, less than four points behind bronze medalist Mana Kawabe. She was named as an alternate for the Japanese Olympic team and assigned to compete at the 2022 Four Continents Championships. Mihara won both segments of the competition to take her second Four Continents gold, as well as a fourth medal at the event overall. She reflected on her comeback to the sport, saying, "I was well supported, surrounded by very warm people, and it showed me how lucky I am. I was happy to come back."

2022–2023 season: Grand Prix Final champion 
Mihara began the season on the Grand Prix at the 2022 MK John Wilson Trophy in Sheffield. Despite an error on the triple flip, she won the short program, finishing 0.17 points ahead of American skater Isabeau Levito. She won the free program by a wider margin after a clean skate, taking her first Grand Prix gold medal. Mihara reflected that her win at the event was "maybe the biggest happiness it gave to me". Her second assignment, the 2022 Grand Prix of Espoo, was widely regarded as a contest between her and Belgium's Loena Hendrickx, the reigning World silver medalist who had earlier won the 2022 Grand Prix de France. Mihara placed second in the short program, 1.30 points behind Hendrickx. Both she and Hendrickx made errors in the free skate segment, but Mihara took first overall, earning her second gold medal and qualifying to the Grand Prix Final for the first time in her career. She cited "a lot of regrets" about the free skate but said she was "happy to go to the Grand Prix Final."

With the Final being held in Turin, Mihara was able to train with longtime friend and fellow qualifier Kaori Sakamoto in the leadup, having not been able to train together for "such a long time." Mihara said she found it "very gratifying." She finished second in the short program, 1.28 points behind Sakamoto and only 0.34 points ahead of third-place Hendrickx. Her score was a new personal best in the segment of 74.58. Mihara went on to finish first in what the ISU itself characterized as a "turbulent" free skate segment, despite underrotating one jump and falling out of another, while frontrunner Sakamoto dropped off the podium entirely. Mihara called the result "unbelievable." The Olympic Channel concluded, "Mihara Mai is having the season of her dreams."

Following her victory at the Final, Mihara entered the 2022–23 Japan Championships as a title contender. She finished second in the short program with a 74.70 score, 3.09 points behind Sakamoto, after the second part of her jump combination was called underrotated. She was second in the free skate as well, albeit 10.03 points behind Sakamoto, winning the silver medal and standing on the Japanese national podium for the first time in six years.

Competing at her second Winter World University Games (formerly Universiade), this time held in Lake Placid, Mihara finished second in the short program behind Sakamoto. She won the free skate, taking the gold medal for a second time. She was on the third woman to win the event twice, after Miwa Fukuhara and Tonia Kwiatkowski. Mihara next appeared at the International Challenge Cup at the end of February, winning the silver medal. Sakamoto and Mana Kawabe joined her on the podium in a Japanese sweep of the medals. She noted that she had missed some training recently as a result of influenza.

Programs

Competitive highlights 

GP: Grand Prix; CS: Challenger Series; JGP: Junior Grand Prix

Detailed results

Senior level 

Small medals for short and free programs awarded only at ISU Championships. At team events, medals are awarded for team results only. Bolded scores reflect an ISU personal best.

Junior level

References

External links 

 
 Japan Skating Federation profile 

1999 births
Japanese female single skaters
Living people
Sportspeople from Kobe
Universiade gold medalists for Japan
Universiade medalists in figure skating
Competitors at the 2019 Winter Universiade
Competitors at the 2023 Winter World University Games
Medalists at the 2019 Winter Universiade
Medalists at the 2023 Winter World University Games
Four Continents Figure Skating Championships medalists
21st-century Japanese women